Crail railway station served the burgh of Crail, Fife, Scotland from 1883 to 1966 on the Fife Coast Railway.

History 
The station opened on 1 September 1883 by the North British Railway. It closed to both passengers on 6 September 1965 and closed to goods on 18 November 1966.

References

External links 

Disused railway stations in Fife
Former North British Railway stations
Railway stations in Great Britain opened in 1883
Railway stations in Great Britain closed in 1965
1883 establishments in Scotland
1966 disestablishments in Scotland
Beeching closures in Scotland
Crail